Tom Wandell (born January 29, 1987) is a Swedish professional ice hockey forward who is currently an unrestricted free agent. He most recently played with Brynäs IF in the Swedish Hockey League (SHL).

Playing career 
Wandell was drafted whilst with the Youth team of Södertälje SK in the 5th round, 146th overall, by the Dallas Stars in the 2005 NHL Entry Draft. He made his debut in Sweden's top-flight SHL during the 2005-06 season. The 2006-07 campaign saw Wandell spent time with Ässät of the Finnish Liiga, before heading to North America, where he played in 53 games for AHL's Iowa Stars in 2007-08.

In 2008–09, he made his NHL debut with the Dallas Stars, but mostly played for Timrå IK of the SHL. He also recorded his first career National Hockey League goal with the Stars on December 12, 2008, in only his second NHL game, by scoring in a 3-1 victory over the Detroit Red Wings.

After six seasons within the Dallas Stars organization, Wandell left to sign a two-year contract in Russia with HC Spartak Moscow of the Kontinental Hockey League on May 3, 2013. In 2014–15, he split time between Avangard Omsk and Admiral Vladivostok.

Prior to the 2015–16 season, Wandell was traded by Admiral Vladivostok, in one of the largest trades in KHL history, to Amur Khabarovsk on June 15, 2015. He made 55 appearances for Amur, tallying four goals and twelve assists. He left the club after the season and signed a two-year deal with Örebro HK of the Swedish Hockey League in May 2016.

After three years with Örebro HK, Wandell left as a free agent following the 2018–19 season. On May 10, 2019, he agreed to a one-year contract with his fourth SHL club, Djurgårdens IF.

Career statistics

Regular season and playoffs

International

References

External links 

1987 births
Living people
Admiral Vladivostok players
Amur Khabarovsk players
Ässät players
Avangard Omsk players
Brynäs IF players
Dallas Stars draft picks
Dallas Stars players
Djurgårdens IF Hockey players
Idaho Steelheads (ECHL) players
Iowa Stars players
Örebro HK players
People from Södertälje
Severstal Cherepovets players
Södertälje SK players
HC Spartak Moscow players
Swedish ice hockey centres
Texas Stars players
Timrå IK players
Sportspeople from Stockholm County